The Santa Maria Ecological Corridor is an ecological corridor in the state of Paraná, Brazil.

Location

The Santa Maria Ecological Corridor crosses the municipalities of Santa Terezinha de Itaipu and São Miguel do Iguaçu in Paraná.
It connects the Iguaçu National Park in Brazil, which adjoins the Iguazú National Park in Argentina, with the protected margins of Lake Itaipu, and via these margins with the Ilha Grande National Park.

The corridor consists of the Apepú River basin, the Fazenda Santa Maria Private Natural Heritage Reserve (RPPN), the Fazenda Santa Maria, the Bonito River Basin and its connection with the protected areas of Itaipu.
It covers the banks of the Apepú river, which rises in the RPPN and flows south into the Iguaçu National Park. 

Environment

This corridor connects several remnants of seasonal semi-deciduous forest in south-western Paraná with reforested areas. 
The forest remnants are in the Iguaçu National Park, the Fazenda São José Legal Reserve and the Fazenda Santa Maria RPPN.
The reforested areas are the Dry Range (Faixa Seca) and the Lake Itaipu Protection Range.
The Fazenda São José Legal Reserve contains secondary growth forest.
The Fazenda Santa Maria RPPN has  of mature Atlantic Forest.
The riparian forests bordering the Bonito River have suffered severe degradation and are undergoing a natural forest recovery process.

History

The Santa Maria Ecological Corridor was created by Brazilian Institute of Environment and Renewable Natural Resources (IBAMA) ordnance 195 of 10 October 2001.
The objectives are to link areas of biological importance to support gene flow of flora and fauna, to increase awareness and environmental education, and to develop research into environmental recovery and conservation.
The corridor was created through a partnership of government and civil society organizations and individuals.
Participation of the local farmers was critical to project success.

Starting in 2003, fragments of forest covering  were preserved and connected.

Notes

Sources

Ecological corridors of Brazil
Protected areas of Paraná (state)
2001 establishments in Brazil